The rufous-bellied tit (Melaniparus rufiventris) is a species of bird in the tit family.

It is found in Africa from the Republic of the Congo, Democratic Republic of the Congo and northern Namibia east to Tanzania and northern  Mozambique.

Its  habitat is subtropical or tropical dry miombo forests.

The adult has a yellow eye, brown in the duller juvenile.

The cinnamon-breasted tit (Melaniparus pallidiventris) has sometimes been considered conspecific with the rufous-bellied tit. The cinnamon-breasted tit has a dark grey breast, washed-out underparts, and a brown eye at all ages.

The rufous-bellied tit was formerly one of the many species in the genus Parus but was moved to the resurrected genus Melaniparus after a molecular phylogenetic analysis published in 2013 showed that the members of the new genus formed a distinct clade.

References

Harrap and Quinn, Tits, Nuthatches and Treecreepers Christopher Helm, 1996

External links

 Rufous-bellied Tit - Species text in The Atlas of Southern African Birds.
Image at ADW

rufous-bellied tit
Birds of Southern Africa
rufous-bellied tit
Taxonomy articles created by Polbot